Sa'idu Ahmed Alkali (born 12 February 1969) is a Nigerian politician who was elected Senator for the Gombe North constituency of Gombe State, Nigeria in August 2010 after the death of the incumbent senator Kawu Peto Dukku. He was reelected in the 2011 national elections, running on the People's Democratic Party (PDP) platform. Also the 2015 and the 2019 General elections.

Alkali lost Gombe North Senatorial seat to Former Gov. Dankwambo in the 2023 general election.

Sa'idu Ahmed Alkali was born on 12 February 1969.  He holds the honorary title of Sarkin Gabas Dukku.
He obtained a Bachelor of Science Degree in Economics, and became a public servant.
Alhaji Sa'idu Ahmed Alkali was formerly commissioner of information in the administration of Governor Danjuma Goje.
After the death of Kawu Peto Dukku in April 2010, he emerged as the consensus candidate for the PDP primarily because he originated from the Dukku Local Government Area. This decision based on geography was criticized by some party members.

In the April 2011 federal elections, Alkali emerged the winner, gaining 136,850 votes on the PDP platform.
Mu'azu Umar Babagoro of the Congress for Progressive Change (CPC) scored 81,519 and Engineer Abdullahi Sa'ad Abubakar of the All Nigeria People's Party (ANPP) received 36,427 votes.

Awards and honours
 Fellow Institute of Corporate Administration.

References

Living people
1969 births
Nigerian Muslims
People from Gombe State
Peoples Democratic Party members of the Senate (Nigeria)
21st-century Nigerian politicians